The Ribat of Sharaf is a historical ribat, or rest place for travellers, located in Razavi Khorasan Province, Iran, between Merv and Nishapur. Built in the 12th century (circa 1114), the building looks like a fortified rectangle from the exterior. The courtyard and four-iwan floorplan is that of the traditional standard Iranian mosque. The walls and the pishtaq, the entrance way inside an iwan, are decorated with vegetal and geometric patterning that function to provide a good example of the "Textile Metaphor" seen in Islamic architecture of this era.
The caravanserai consists of two inter-related four Iwan planned courtyards, famous for owning some of the most diverse and beautiful brick decorations in Iranian architecture.

See also
Islamic architecture
Islamic art
Robat (disambiguation)
Timeline of Islamic history

References

Buildings and structures completed in 1114
12th-century architecture
Ribats
Architecture in Iran
Caravanserais in Iran
National works of Iran
Tourist attractions in Razavi Khorasan Province